James W. Sturr Jr. is an American polka musician, trumpeter, clarinetist, saxophonist and leader of Jimmy Sturr & His Orchestra. His recordings have won 18 out of the 24 Grammy Awards given for Best Polka Album. Sturr's orchestra is on the Top Ten List of the All-Time Grammy Awards, and has acquired more Grammy nominations than anyone in the history of musical polka awards.

Touring history
Sturr and his orchestra have performed at Carnegie Hall, Lincoln Center in New York City, Yankee Stadium  and the Palace of Culture in Warsaw, Poland.  When touring, the band rides in Jimmy's 45-foot customized tour bus, previously owned by Billy Ray Cyrus.

Radio show
Sturr hosts a syndicated radio show on stations including WTBQ in his hometown of Florida, New York, the station he once owned. He also has a weekly radio show on the Rural Radio channel on SirusXM.

Discography
 All American Polka Festival
 All in My Love for You (1990 Grammy)
 The Best of Jimmy Sturr and His Orchestra
 The Big Band Polka Sound
 Born to Polka (1989 Grammy)
 Come on and Dance (Live from RFD-TV) (2014)
 Come Share the Wine (2008 Grammy)
 Dance with Me (1999 Grammy)
 Double Magic
 First Class Polkas
 Forget Me Never
 Gone Polka with Willie Nelson, Brenda Lee (2002 Grammy)
 Gonna be Good Times (2017)
 Grammy Gold
 Greatest Hits of Polka
 I Love to Polka (1996 Grammy)
 I Remember Warsaw (1987 Grammy)
 A Jimmy Sturr Christmas
 Let the Whole World Sing (2009 Grammy)
 Let's Polka 'Round with Charlie Daniels, Bela Fleck, Boots Randolph (2004 Grammy)
 Life's a Polka
 Live at Gilley's! (1992 Grammy)
 Living on Polka Time with Bill Anderson, Flaco Jiménez (1998 Grammy)
 Most Requested Hits
 Not Just Another Polka
 Please Have Them Play a Polka Just for Me (1988 Grammy)
 Polka! All Night Long with Willie Nelson (1997 Grammy)
 Polka Christmas
 Polka Christmas in My Home Town
 Polka Cola (Music That Refreshes) with Bill Anderson (2009)
 Polka Fever (1978)
 Polka in Paradise with Bobby Vinton (2007 Grammy)
 Polka is My Life
 Polka Party
 Polkapalooza
 Primetime Polkas
 Pure Country
 Pure Polka
 Rock 'N' Polka
 Saturday Night Polka
 Shake, Rattle and Polka! (2006 Grammy)
 Stir Up a Musical Mix
 Sturr It Up
 Sturr Struck 
 Top of the World with Arlo Guthrie, Rhonda Vincent (2003 Grammy)
 Touched by a Polka with Mel Tillis (2001 Grammy)
 Tribute to the Legends of Polka Music
 When It's Polka Time at Your House (1991 Grammy)

Band members
Main band members

Jimmy Sturr - Leader, Vocals, Clarinet, Saxophone, Drums, and Trumpet
Rick Henly - Trumpet
Bill Ash - Trumpet
Kenny Harbus - Trumpet & Vocals
Jim Perry - Clarinet, Alto Saxophone, and Tenor Saxophone
Nick DeVito - Clarinet & Alto Saxophone
Johnny Karas - Tenor Saxophone & Vocals
Ron Oswanski - Piano & Accordion
Frank Urbanovitch - Violin & Vocals
Rich Pavasaris - Bass Guitar
Rich Berends - Drums

Other band members/reoccurring members

Tom Conklin - Bus Driver
Jim Dixon - Bus Driver
Gus Kosior - Manager & Bus Driver
Barbara James - Assistant Manager
Al Piatkowski - Accordion
Nick Koryluk - Accordion
Joe Mariany - Clarinet and Saxophone
Ray Barno - Clarinet, Alto Saxophone, and Baritone Saxophone
Chris Caffery - Guitar
Jim Uzwack- Sound engineer

Past members
William “Bill” Hulle - Bass
Hank Golis - Trumpet
Kevin Krauth - Trumpet & Vocals
Al Noble - Trumpet
Ben Poole - Trumpet
Eric Parks - Trumpet
Paul Ketterer - Trumpet
Dana Sylvander - Trombone
Dennis Coyman - Drums
Bill Langan - Bass Guitar
Mike Ralff - Bass Guitar
Dave Kowalski - Guitar
Eddie Burton - Guitar
Lou Pallo - Guitar
Kevin Chase - Guitar
Walt Cunningham - Strings & Banjo
Ed Goldberg - Piano & Bass
Jeff Hoffman - Piano
Jeff Miller - Piano
Keith Slattery - Piano
Lenny Filipowski - Piano
Dennis Polisky - Clarinet & Alto Saxophone
Greg Dolecki - Clarinet & Alto Saxophone
Joe Magnuszewski - Clarinet & Alto Saxophone
Peter Kargul - Violin
Ryan Joseph - Violin
Steve Wnuk - Violin
Gene Bartkiewicz - Accordion
Wally Czerniawski - Accordion
Darlene Morrow - Violin
Mark Zaki - Violin
Steve Swiader - Accordion
Gennarose - Vocals
Lance Wing - Vocals
Lindsey Webster - Vocals
John Doolan - Equipment Manager
Bryan Doolan - Roadie
Thomas 'Tom' Karas - Accordion/keyboard (1983-1989)

References

External links
Official website
Interview with Jimmy Sturr

1941 births
Living people
Polka musicians
Grammy Award winners
Singers from New York (state)
American male saxophonists
American clarinetists
American male singers
New York (state) Democrats
People from Warwick, New York
21st-century American saxophonists
21st-century clarinetists
21st-century American male musicians